Driller may refer to:
Driller (oil), a job in the oil industry
Driller (video game), a 1987 game for various 8- and 16-bit home microcomputers
The Driller, a giant alien creature in the Transformers films - see List of Transformers film series cast and characters

See also
Drill
Drilling